The Journal of Materials Research and Technology is a quarterly peer-reviewed open access scientific journal covering metallurgy and materials and minerals research and technology. It is published by Elsevier on behalf of the Brazilian Metallurgical, Materials and Mining Association. The editor-in-chief is Marc A. Meyers (University of California, San Diego).

Abstracting and indexing 
The journal is abstracted and indexed in Scopus.

References

External links 
 

Elsevier academic journals
Academic journals associated with learned and professional societies
Quarterly journals
English-language journals
Publications established in 2012
Materials science journals